Andrey Leymenov (born 14 June 1986) is a Kazakhstani long-distance runner.

In 2018, he competed in the men's half marathon at the 2018 IAAF World Half Marathon Championships held in Valencia, Spain. He finished in 125th place.

References

External links 
 

Living people
1986 births
Place of birth missing (living people)
Kazakhstani male long-distance runners
Kazakhstani male marathon runners